Baewha Women's University is a private Christian university located in Jongno-gu, Seoul, South Korea.  Enrollment fluctuates around 1,350, and is restricted to women.  Courses of study are offered in interpretation (English, Japanese and Chinese), traditional cuisine, clothing, business management, secretarial studies, e-commerce, nutrition, early childhood education, and applied information processing.

History
The school was founded by the Baewha Educational Foundation, in 1977.  The foundation's roots are much older, however; it was established in 1898 by the American Methodist missionary Josephine Eaton Peel Campbell.

See also
Education in South Korea
List of colleges and universities in South Korea

External links
  

Baewha Women's University
Women's universities and colleges in South Korea
1977 establishments in South Korea
Educational institutions established in 1977